Concord-Carlisle High School (CCHS) is a public high school located in Concord, Massachusetts, United States. The school serves grades 9–12, and as part of the Concord-Carlisle Regional School District, has students from both Concord and Carlisle, Massachusetts. The school also has a notable portion of minority students from Boston (particularly Dorchester, Roxbury and Mattapan) enrolled as part of the METCO program. Concord-Carlisle Regional High School is widely regarded as one of the top public high schools in the state, with the September 2009 issue of Boston magazine rating it the number one public high school in cost efficiency and third in academic performance in eastern Massachusetts.

Academics
Class subjects include the normal core subjects of English, mathematics, science and social studies, but a number of elective studies are offered as well, including programming, art, music, and photography.

In social studies or English, a broad course selection is offered. CCHS does not offer AP classes in the humanities, but students may choose to take the AP tests. For students' freshman and sophomore years, they are required to take world cultures and US history respectively, neither of which are levelled classes. The English department offers classes on topics such as rhetoric and debate, American literature, British literature, contemporary literature, world literature and black literature. The social studies department curriculum includes classes on ancient Greece, ancient Rome and 20th century United States history, as well as psychology, economics, sociology, world religions and Russian history.

Foreign languages offered are French, Spanish, Latin and Chinese.

Educational experiences and trips to other countries include one to Edinburgh, Scotland in 2008, two to Prague in the Czech Republic, Salzburg and Vienna in Austria in 2001 and 2005, a trip which explored the entire length of Italy from north to south in 2003, and a trip to Spain in 2004, staying in Madrid and Málaga. In 2008, 2009, 2012 and 2014 there were trips to Quito, Ecuador. In 2003, 2007, 2009, 2010 and 2012 there were trips to Hokkaido, Japan, for the Concert Band and the Sci Fi club. There have been trips to China, East Timor and Estonia.

A trip to Italy for Latin students is regularly offered, as is an exchange program with a private school in Ecuador and an exchange program with Concord's Japanese sister city of Nanae.

Extracurriculars
The school supports a moot court, Spectrum: Gay/Straight Alliance, Dance Crew, The Voice (newspaper), Reflections (a literature and art review), yearbook club, several foreign language clubs (Spanish, French, as well as an Asian culture club),  and high school radio station (WIQH 88.3 FM), among others. Concord-Carlisle also hosts local chapters of Key Club International, Model United Nations, Amnesty International, Interact Club, JSA, Academic Bowl and a Math Team.

Arts
The music department supports a Concert Band, Repertory Band, orchestra, chorus and numerous jazz ensembles.

In 1998, 2004, 2007 and 2010 the Concert Band traveled to Japan and played with the Sapporo Shiroishi High School wind ensemble. The joint concert by these two bands took place in Sapporo at the Sapporo Concert Hall. Additionally, the CCHS Concert Band has won a gold medal at the annual Massachusetts Instrumental and Choral Conductors Association invitational for the past 19 consecutive years, earning the chance to perform at Tanglewood, Boston's Symphony Hall and Mechanics Hall in Worcester, Massachusetts numerous times.

In winter 2011, over 120 students participated in a musical production of The Producers. Other shows performed at Concord-Carlisle include A Little Night Music, West Side Story and Falsettos. In early 2013, the theatre department performed A Chorus Line, and was recognized with nominations from the Massachusetts Educational Theater Guild for outstanding production and performance in three separate categories. A production of Gilbert and Sullivan's The Pirates of Penzance the following year received five nominations, winning one. In April 2014, an adaptation of the play Nation, based on the novel by Terry Pratchett, was selected to represent Massachusetts at the New England High School Drama Festival in St. Johnsbury Vermont.

Athletics
CCHS supports all of the 33 available sports teams organized by the Massachusetts Interscholastic Athletic Association (MIAA). The fall sports include soccer, girls' field hockey, girls' volleyball, cross country, boys' American Football and boys' golf. Winter sports are fencing, basketball, indoor track and field, ice hockey, alpine skiing, cross-country skiing, swimming, diving and wrestling. The spring sports are baseball, lacrosse, softball, tennis, outdoor track and field, boys' volleyball and gymnastics. Concord Carlisle has made its cheerleading team a sport with fall (American football) and winter (basketball) cheerleading. They compete in competitions and support the school's teams.

In most sports, Concord Carlisle competes in the Dual County League.

CCHS also offers a squash club in the winter and an ultimate frisbee club in the spring.

Cross country
The school has both a girls and boys cross-country team. In 2017, the boys’ team came in fourth in the Massachusetts Division 1 state meet, while the girls’ team won. In 2018, the boys' team won the state meet and the girls' team came in second. In 2019, the girls' team won the state meet. The boys' team placed third.

Fencing
Concord-Carlisle's fencing team was the first in the state of Massachusetts 2018 and 2019. This winter sport has men's and women's teams, with JV and Varsity levels. CCHS's fencing team has produced two individual Olympic Champions, and numerous individual state champions.

Swim and dive team
One of the largest sports team at this school, there are members every year who make it to the Sectionals and State meets.

The diving team has produced several individual state champions.

Ski team
Nationally recognized in 1998 as a top ski school. The team competes at a local ski area in both slalom and giant slalom races. Dr. Bob Furey, head ski coach since 1972, was awarded the National Coaches Association Ski Coach of the Year Award in the early 1990s. Johnstone retired in 2007. In 2007, he was awarded a Boston Globe All-Scholastic Coach of the Year.

The Nordic ski team won the Mass Bay West Divisional title for both the girls' varsity and boys' varsity team. The team also did well in state competitions: the girls' team secured second place and the boys' team had a close third-place finish.

In 2018, after an undefeated regular season for both the boys' and girls' teams, the boys' team won the state championship.

American football
The Patriots made it to the 2010 MIAA Eastern Mass Div. 2A Super Bowl at Gillette Stadium before losing to Duxbury High School. It was the team's first Super Bowl place since 1978. On December 3, 2011, the Patriots football team returned to Gillette Stadium and beat Oliver Ames High School by a score 42–9, to finish the season undefeated at 13–0, as the MIAA Eastern Mass Div. 3 Super Bowl Champions.

Soccer
The CCHS boys' soccer team is also consistently highly ranked, not just in the state, but nationally. In 2010, CCHS was ranked No. 16 nationally and No. 2 in New England by the National Soccer Coaches Association of America. The team also won its second straight state championship and its third in five years.

In 2014, the CCHS boys' team finished with a record of 20-0-1 and won the school's fourth state championship. The team was ranked No. 1 in Massachusetts by ESPN Boston and No. 8 in the nation by the National Soccer Coaches Association of America. The team conceded only eight goals all season and posted the school's first no-loss record.

In 2017, the CCHS boys' team also won the MIAA Division 2 State Championship, defeating Oliver Ames by a score of 2-1 in the final.

The CCHS girls soccer team has many accomplishments including undefeated seasons and many division titles. In addition, they have progressed to the state finals multiple times and years in a row.

Golf
In 2013, the golf team captured the second state title in program history (the first in 2008), winning the Division 2 state championship by 12 shots. The program has placed in the top four in the state five of the last six years, including a third-place finish in 2011. The program has won Dual County League Small Division titles in 2011, 2012 and 2013. In 2019 the golf team had a notable season, placing second in the state championship and losing by only one stroke.

Girls Ice Hockey
On February 15, 2021, the CCHS Girls Varsity Hockey Team won their first DCL Large Championship in an 4-3 overtime win over league rivals Waltham.

New school building project
Concord Carlisle High School moved to a new, eco-friendly building in mid-April 2015, after almost 18 years of planning. The old school was built in the 1960s and 1970s, with a one-level "California Layout" that was unsuitable for Massachusetts weather and conditions. Initial approval for the building of the school was granted by the towns of Concord and Carlisle in 2011. The school took around 4 years to build, and is situated directly behind where the former CCHS building once stood, facing backwards. The project cost $93 million.

The new school has a 600-seat auditorium, 2 attached gyms, and a 'media wall' consisting of 9 flat-screen televisions in the cafeteria. The new building also includes many updated safety features that the old building lacked, including fewer exits and entrances, and automated doors with security cameras and alarms.

On September 6, 2022, voters elected to raise taxes by an estimated $660,822 in order to redesign and rebuild the school's access road. Supporters of this issue claimed that the road was in poor condition, and needed repairing. People against the proposition claimed that since the road was perfectly useable, a tax increase could be used on many other important things, such as fixing the roof.

Notable alumni

 Chester G. Atkins, former Congressman from Massachusetts's 5th congressional district
 Liz Cho, television journalist, WABC-TV New York
 Bob Diamond, former chief executive officer of Barclays
 Will Eno, American playwright and Pulitzer Prize finalist 
 Kristin Hedstrom, USA rowing national team member and London 2012 Olympian
 Sam Presti, general manager of the NBA's Oklahoma City Thunder
 John Tortorella, former head coach of the Columbus Blue Jackets of the NHL
Clairo, indie-pop musician

References

External links
Concord-Carlisle High School website
District website
Graffiti Incident

Buildings and structures in Concord, Massachusetts
Schools in Middlesex County, Massachusetts
Public high schools in Massachusetts